Gao Zhunyi (born 21 August 1995) is a Chinese professional footballer who currently plays as a centre-back or full-back for Chinese Super League club Wuhan Three Towns.

Club career
Gao Zhunyi started his football career when he joined Shanghai Luckystar in 2009. On 31 January 2014, he transferred to J2 League side Kataller Toyama, which made him the third Chinese footballer to play in the Japanese professional leagues after Jia Xiuquan and Xu Xiaofei. He made his debut for the club on 26 March 2014 in a 2–1 loss against Yokohama FC, becoming the youngest footballer ever to play for Kataller Toyama. He scored his first goal for the club on 29 April 2014 in a 3–2 win against Matsumoto Yamaga FC, making him the youngest goalscorer in the club's history at 18 years, 8 months and 8 days. On 13 January 2015, Gao transferred to fellow second tier side Avispa Fukuoka after Kataller Toyama was relegated in the 2014 season. He made his debut for the club on 1 April 2015 in a 2–2 draw against Yokohoma FC.

On 3 July 2015, Gao transferred to Chinese Super League side Shandong Luneng. On 25 February 2016, Gao was loaned out to fellow top tier side Hebei China Fortune until 31 January 2017. He made his debut for the club on 4 March 2016 in a 2–1 win against Guangzhou R&F, coming on as a substitute for Dong Xuesheng. In February 2017, Gao permanently transferred to the club after rejecting an offer from Liga I side CFR Cluj.

On 2 February 2019, Gao transferred to fellow top tier side Guangzhou Evergrande. He would make his debut for the club in a league game against Tianjin Tianhai on 1 March 2019 in a 3-0 victory. Throughout the season he would go on to establish himself as a vital member within the team and go on to win the 2019 Chinese Super League title with the club.

On 28 April 2022, he signed with newly promoted top tier side Wuhan Three Towns. He would go on to make his debut on 12 August 2022, in a league game against Beijing Guoan, which ended in a 5-1 victory. After the game he would go on to establish himself as a regular within the team that won the 2022 Chinese Super League title.

International career
Gao made his debut for the Chinese national team on 10 January 2017 in a 2–0 loss against Iceland during the 2017 China Cup.

Personal life
Gao Zhunyi is the son of former Chinese footballer Gao Zhongxun.

Career statistics

Club statistics
.

International statistics

Honours

Club
Guangzhou Evergrande
Chinese Super League: 2019

Wuhan Three Towns
Chinese Super League: 2022.

References

External links
 
 

1995 births
Living people
Chinese footballers
Chinese people of Korean descent
Footballers from Jilin
People from Yanbian
Association football defenders
Chinese Super League players
J2 League players
Kataller Toyama players
Avispa Fukuoka players
Shandong Taishan F.C. players
Hebei F.C. players
Guangzhou F.C. players
Chinese expatriate footballers
Expatriate footballers in Japan
Chinese expatriate sportspeople in Japan
China international footballers
Footballers at the 2018 Asian Games
Asian Games competitors for China